Cormocephalus kraepelini, also known as the Margaret River centipede, is a species of centipede in the Scolopendridae family. It is endemic to Australia, and was first described in 1930 by Austrian myriapodologist Carl Attems.

Distribution
The species is found in south-west Western Australia.

Behaviour
The centipedes are solitary terrestrial predators that inhabit plant litter, soil and rotting wood.

References

 

 
kraepelini
Centipedes of Australia
Endemic fauna of Australia
Fauna of Western Australia
Animals described in 1930
Taxa named by Carl Attems